The  Chrysler VF Valiant  is an automobile that was produced in Australia by Chrysler Australia from 1969 to 1970. It was released in March 1969, replacing the Chrysler VE Valiant.

Changes
The VF Valiant was a facelifted version of the VE Valiant, featuring four new quarter panels, new lights and a new grille. Parking and Turn signal lights were now mounted above the headlights. Seating, safety features and soundproofing were improved, Pacer and Regal 770 models were new and a hardtop body style was offered for the first time.

The hardtop combined the VF Valiant front, from the A-pillar forward, with the rear of the US Dodge Dart. This included the Dart floorpan with its 111-inch wheelbase.

Coupe utilities retained the rear styling of the previous VE series with only the front styling revised.

Model range
The VF series Valiant was offered in 4-door sedan, 2-door hardtop,  5-door station wagon and 2-door coupe utility models.
 Valiant sedan (VF-M41)
 Valiant hardtop (VF-M23)
 Valiant Safari wagon (VF-M45)
 Valiant Pacer sedan (VF-S41)
 Valiant Regal sedan (VF-H41)
 Valiant Regal hardtop (VF-H23)
 Valiant Regal Safari wagon (VF- H45)
 Valiant Regal 770 sedan (VF-H41 shared with Regal)
 Valiant Regal 770 hardtop (VF-H23 shared with Regal)
 Valiant utility (VF-L20)
 Valiant Wayfarer utility (VF-M20)

The hardtop models were introduced in September 1969. There were also 20 Pacer station wagons built. These show up in production records as model code VF-S45.

Dodge utility
A heavy duty variant of the Valiant utility was marketed under the Dodge name. (VF-E20)

Engines and transmissions
Five engines were offered in the VF Valiant range.
 145 bhp  Slant-six
 160 bhp  "High Performance" Slant-six
 175 bhp  "High Compression" Slant-six
 210 bhp  V8
 230 bhp  "Fireball" V8

The “High Compression” six was fitted to the Pacer and was not available in other models. The "Fireball" V8 was standard on Regal 770 models.

Two transmissions were available.
 Three speed manual
 Three speed "Torqueflite" automatic

Chrysler VF VIP

In May 1969 Chrysler Australia released the VF series Chrysler VIP (VF-P41). The VIP had a 112-inch (2850 mm) wheelbase, which was 4 inches longer than that of the Valiant sedan. The VIP was visually differentiated with a four headlight grille, unique tail-lights and a “limousine” rear window. The car was badged and marketed as the “VIP by Chrysler”, unlike the VE model, which was a Chrysler Valiant VIP. The VIP station wagon was no longer offered.

Production and replacement
A total of 52,933 VF series models, including 3,721 VIPs, were built prior to its replacement by the VG Valiant  in March 1970.

See also
 Chrysler Valiant

References

Cars of Australia
Valiant vehicles
Valiant
Cars introduced in 1969
1960s cars
1970s cars